Phthiracaridae is a family of oribatid mites in the order Oribatida. There are about 7 genera and at least 710 described species in Phthiracaridae.

Genera
 Atropacarus Ewing, 1917
 Hoplophorella Berlese, 1923
 Hoplophthiracarus Jacot, 1933
 Notophthiracarus Ramsay, 1966
 Phthiracarus Perty, 1841
 Rhacaplacarus Niedbala, 1986
 Steganacarus Ewing, 1917

References

Further reading

 
 
 
 

Acariformes
Acari families